Porci con la P 38 is a 1979 Italian "poliziottesco" film directed by Gianfranco Pagani. It stars actor Gabriele Ferzetti.

Cast
 Marc Porel as Morris
 Laura Belli as  Gloria
 Raymond Pellegrin as Olden
 Luciano Pigozzi as John (as Alan Collins)
 Gabriele Ferzetti as Max Astarita
 Lea Lander as Astarita's Lover

Plot
A police inspector investigates three murders between an old boss of the Mafia, and two of his men. When the daughter of the Commissioner is kidnapped by a former ally of the old boss, the wife of the Commissioner is being blackmailed and forced to steal a lighter from police offices. The former ally of the old mafia is killed by his mistress and the Commissioner can rescue his daughter.

References

External links

1979 films
1970s Italian-language films
Poliziotteschi films
1970s Italian films